Obaapa Christy (née Christiana Twene) formerly Christiana Love is a Ghanaian Gospel musician. The Meti Ase hit singer was recipient of Gospel Artist of the Year and Song of the Year Awards during the 2007 edition of Ghana Music Awards. In 2008, she was conferred with a National honor by John Kufuor.

Early life 
She was born in Kumasi in the Ashanti Region of Ghana, in a family of 9 siblings.

Career 
She released a new Single titled, The Glory in 2021.

Awards and nominations

Vodafone Ghana Music Awards 

|-
|rowspan="3"|2007
| Herself
| Best female vocal performance
|
|-
| Herself
| Gospel Artist of the Year
|
|-
| 'Ade Akye Abia' Kwaku Gyasi featuring Christiana Love
| Best Collaboration of the Year
|

References

21st-century Ghanaian women singers
21st-century Ghanaian singers
Ghanaian gospel singers
People from Kumasi
Year of birth missing (living people)
Living people